Chow-its-hoot (also spelled as Cha-wit-zit or Chowitsuit) is a Lummi name. Several Lummi individuals carried this name. The name means "Strong Man".

Point Elliott Treaty
Commonly, the name refers to the man who was the third of 82 Native Americans (including Chief Seattle) to sign the controversial Treaty of Point Elliott in 1855. Chow-its-hoot signed on behalf of his southern band of Lummis.

Family
Chief Chow-its-hoot had no offspring.  His father was named Sa-hop-kan. One brother, Chil-luk, preceded him in death. Another brother Sub-Chief T'see-leeq (Ts-elixw) fathered Chief Henry Kwina and Clara, wife of John Alexander A third brother, Klut-wu-lum served as Chow-its-hoot's witness/listener.

Potlatches
Chowitsuit was sometimes called "the richest Lummi" because he owned several reef net sites and hosted seven potlatches in his lifetime. A potlatch is a giant giveaway whereat the host gives away all or nearly all of his/her possessions. Potlatches serve a socio-economic purpose amongst NW tribes as a man's wealth is measured by what one gives, not by what one keeps.

Status
As a result of Chowitsuit's generosity, he earned status amongst Lummis. This status led Whatcom County pioneers to consider Chowitsuit Chief of the Lummi Tribe. However, his contemporary tribal members referred to Chow-its-hoot as a "speaker", meaning he spoke on behalf of his people. Speakers visited clan matriarchs (traditionally with a secondary listener) and listened to their concerns. Thereafter, speakers were expected to repeat concerns on behalf of the clans as they heard them.

Naming of Whatcom Falls/County
Chow-its-hoot made friends with the first "hwa-ni-tum" ("non-Native" in Lummi) to settle in the area, Russell Peabody. Peabody was looking for a waterfall on which he could build a saw mill. Chow-its-hoot explained that the Lummis had no word for "waterfall" and that he was looking for "whatcom", which means "loud water" in Lummi language. So, Chowitsuit directed Peabody to a waterfall that would later be named "Whatcom Falls" and Peabody proceeded to build the first saw mill there.

Death
Chowitsuit and the Lummis helped the first pioneers survive in Whatcom County. He and Peabody became friends. According to Peabody's journals, Chowitsuit sent messengers to ask Peabody to visit him at his home on Portage Island where Chowitsuit told Peabody that Haida had stolen his hair and performed black magic on it. Chowitsuit forecasted to Peabody his own death and called Peabody to Portage Island to say "good bye" to his old friend. Peabody didn't believe Chowitsuit because of his apparent good health. Nevertheless, Chowitsuit died soon thereafter.

Namesakes
The name Chowitsuit carries with it elevated respect within the Lummi and Nooksack Tribes. The late Damian Solomon (Nooksack) carried the name and was followed by the late Richard Solomon (Lummi).

Symbol
Chow-its-hoot's symbol, 3 circles forming the shape of an equilateral triangle, connected by lines on two of three sides.

Legacy
A totem pole on the southeastern side of the Whatcom County court house depicts Chow-its-hoot and his brother Klut-wu-lum shepherding Peabody in a canoe.

References

Indigenous people of the Pacific Northwest